Virgilio Jiménez (born 2 June 1940) is a Cuban boxer. He competed in the men's welterweight event at the 1964 Summer Olympics.

References

1940 births
Living people
Cuban male boxers
Olympic boxers of Cuba
Boxers at the 1964 Summer Olympics
Place of birth missing (living people)
Welterweight boxers